A virgin birth can refer to:

Parthenogenesis, birth without fertilization
Miraculous births, virgin birth in mythology and religion
Virgin birth of Jesus
Trinitarian doctrine of Jesus' nature
Artificial insemination
Russell case (1920s)